This is a list of New Zealand species extinct in the Holocene that covers extinctions from the Holocene epoch, a geologic epoch that began about 11,650 years before present (about 9700 BCE) and continues to the present day.

New Zealand proper includes the North Island, South Island, offshore islands, and outlying islands like the Chathams. The Realm of New Zealand also includes Tokelau (a dependent territory); the Cook Islands and Niue (self-governing states in free association with New Zealand); and the Ross Dependency (New Zealand's territorial claim in Antarctica). Only New Zealand proper is represented on this list. For extinctions in dependent territories see the List of Oceanian animals extinct in the Holocene.

Numerous species have disappeared from Hawaii as part of the ongoing Holocene extinction, driven by human activity. Human contact, first by Polynesians and later by Europeans, had a significant impact on the environment. New Zealand was among the last places on earth that humans settled. The first settlers of New Zealand migrated from Polynesia and became the Māori people. According to archeological and genetic research, the ancestors of the Māori arrived in New Zealand no earlier than about 1280 CE, with at least the main settlement period between about 1320 and 1350, consistent with evidence based on genealogical traditions. No credible evidence exists of pre-Māori settlement of New Zealand. The arrival of the Māori resulted in animal extinctions due to deforestation and hunting. The Māori also brought two species of land mammals, Polynesian rats (Rattus exulans) and kurī, a breed of domestic dog (Canis lupus familiaris). In pre-human times, bats were the only land mammals found in New Zealand. Polynesian rats definitely contributed to extinctions, and kurī might have contributed as well.

In 1642, the Dutch navigator Abel Tasman became the first European explorer known to visit New Zealand. In 1769, British explorer James Cook became the first European to map New Zealand and communicate with the Māori. From the late 18th century, the country was regularly visited by explorers and other sailors, missionaries, traders and adventurers. In 1840, the Treaty of Waitangi annexed New Zealand into the British Empire. As a result of the influx of settlers, the population of Pākehā (European New Zealanders) grew explosively from fewer than 1,000 in 1831 to 500,000 by 1881. Like the Māori settlers centuries earlier, the European settlers hunted native animals and engaged in habitat destruction. They also introduced numerous invasive species. A few examples are black rats (Rattus rattus) and brown rats (Rattus norvegicus), domestic cats (Felis catus), stoats (Mustela erminea), and common brushtail possums (Trichosurus vulpecula).

This list only includes the indigenous biota of New Zealand, not domestic animals like the kurī.

Mammals (class Mammalia)

Carnivorans (order Carnivora)

Eared seals (family Otariidae)

Bats (order Chiroptera)

New Zealand short-tailed bats (family Mystacinidae)

Possibly extinct

Birds (class Aves)

Moa (order Dinornithiformes)

Giant moa (family Dinornithidae)

Lesser moa (family Emeidae)

Upland moa (family Megalapterygidae)

Landfowl (order Galliformes)

Megapodes (family Megapodidae)

Pheasants and allies (family Phasianidae)

Waterfowl (order Anseriformes)

Ducks, geese, and swans (family Anatidae)

Pigeons and doves (order Columbiformes)

Pigeons and doves (family Columbidae)

Rails and cranes (order Gruiformes)

Adzebills (family Aptornithidae)

Rails (family Rallidae)

Shorebirds (order Charadriiformes)

Sandpipers (family Scolopacidae)

Owlet-nightjars (order Aegotheliformes)

Owlet-nightjars (family Aegothelidae)

Albatrosses and petrels (order Procellariiformes)

Petrels and shearwaters (family Procellariidae)

Penguins (order Sphenisciformes)

Penguins (family Spheniscidae)

Pelicans, herons, and ibises (order Pelecaniformes)

Herons (family Ardeidae)

Hawks and relatives (order Accipitriformes)

Hawks, eagles, kites, harriers and Old World vultures (family Accipitridae)

Owls (order Strigiformes)

True owls (family Strigidae)

Parrots (order Psittaciformes)

Kea and kākā (family Nestoridae)

Old World parrots (family Psittaculidae)

Perching birds (order Passeriformes)

New Zealand wrens (family Acanthisittidae)

Honeyeaters (family Meliphagidae)

Old World orioles (family Oriolidae)

Crows and relatives (family Corvidae)

New Zealand wattlebirds (family Callaeidae) 
{| class="wikitable sortable"
!Common name
!Scientific name
!Range
!class="unsortable"|Comments
!class="unsortable"|Pictures
|-
|Huia
|Heteralocha acutirostris
|North Island
|Last accepted sighting in 1907, but it's likely that a few persisted into the 1920s. Predation by introduced mammals and, to a lesser extent, human hunting, was the likely cause of extinction. Large areas of native forest containing huia were logged or burned in the 1800s to make way for farming, but this would have caused a modest range reduction rather than being a major contributor to extinction. Māori traditionally prized and wore huia tail feathers as a mark of status. Tail feathers became fashionable in Britain after the Duke of York was photographed wearing one during a 1901 visit to New Zealand. Overseas bird collectors and museums bought mounted specimens and tail feathers. Austrian naturalist Andreas Reischek took 212 pairs between 1877 and 1889. Walter Buller recorded that 11 Maori hunters took 646 huia skins from the forest between Manawatū Gorge and Ākitio during one month in 1863. Gilbert Mair recorded eating 'a splendid stew of Huia, Kaka, Pigeons & Bacon''' with Buller at a bush camp in Wairarapa, October 1883, after shooting 16 huia and capturing live birds. Thousands of huia were exported overseas. Protection measures enacted in the 1890s were poorly enforced. Two male birds kept at London Zoo in the 1880s died in captivity. Plans to transfer huia to Kapiti and Little Barrier Island reserves never eventuated. A pair captured in 1893 for transfer to Little Barrier was acquired by Buller and apparently sent to Baron Walter Rothschild in England.
|
|}

 Possibly extinct, New Zealand wattlebirds (family Callaeidae) 

 Grassbirds and allies (family Locustellidae) 

 Reptiles (class Reptilia) 

 Squamates (order Squamata) 

 Stone geckos (family Diplodactylidae) 

 Skinks (family Scincidae) 

 Amphibians (class Amphibia) 

 Frogs (order Anura) 

 New Zealand primitive frogs (family Leiopelmatidae) 

 Ray-finned fish (class Actinopterygii) 

 Smelts (order Osmeriformes) 

 Australia-New Zealand smelts and graylings (family Retropinnidae) 

 Insects (class Insecta) 

 Beetles (order Coleoptera) 

 Ground beetles (family Carabidae) 

 Segmented worms (phylum Annelida) 

 Clitellates (class Clitellata) 

 Family Megascolecidae 

 Plants (kingdom Plantae) 

 Order Brassicales 

 Mustard and crucifer family (family Brassicaceae) 

 Order Santalales 

 Showy mistletoes (family Loranthaceae) 

 Order Caryophyllales 

 Pink and carnation family (family Caryophyllaceae) 

 Order Gentianales 

 Family Loganiaceae 

 Order Boraginales 

 Borage and forget-me-not family (family Boraginaceae) 

 See also 
 List of Australia-New Guinea species extinct in the Holocene
 List of Hawaiian animals extinct in the Holocene 
 List of Oceanian animals extinct in the Holocene 
 Holocene extinction
 Lists of extinct animals
 List of extinct bird species since 1500
 List of Late Quaternary prehistoric bird species
 New Zealand Threat Classification System
 New Zealand geologic time scale

Notes

References

Further reading
 Bell, B.D. 1994. A review of the status of New Zealand Leiopelma species (Anura: Leiopelmatidae), including a summary of demographic studies in Coromandel and on Maud Island. New Zealand Journal of Zoology, Vol. 21: 341–349.
 Bunce, M., Worthy, T.H., Ford, T., Hoppitt, W., Willerslev, E., Drummond A., and Cooper, A. 2003. Extreme reversed sexual size dimorphism in the extinct New Zealand moa Dinornis. Nature, 425:172–175.
 Cooper, A., Lalueza-Fox, C., Anderson, C., Rambaut, A., Austin, J., and Ward, R. 2001. Complete mitochondrial genome sequences of two extinct moas clarify ratite evolution. Nature 409:704–707.
 Day, D., 1981, The Doomsday Book of Animals, Ebury Press, London.
 Gill, B.; Martinson, P., (1991) New Zealand’s Extinct Birds, Random Century New Zealand Ltd.
 Gill, B. J. 2003. Osteometry and systematics of the extinct New Zealand ravens (Aves: Corvidae: Corvus). Journal of Systematic Palaeontology 1: 43–58.
 Flannery, T., and Schouten, P., 2001, A Gap in Nature: Discovering the World's Extinct Animals, William Heinemann, London.  (UK edition).
 Fuller, E., 2001, Extinct Birds, Oxford University Press.  (UK Edition).
 Huynen, L., Millar, C.D., Scofield, R.P., and Lambert, D.M. 2003. Nuclear DNA sequences detect species limits in ancient moa. Nature, 425:175–178.
 Perkins, S. 2003. Three Species No Moa? Fossil DNA analysis yields surprise. Science News, 164:84.
 Philip R. Millener & T. H. Worthy (1991). "Contribution to New Zealand's late Quaternary avifauna. II: Dendroscansor decurvirostris, a new genus and species of wren (Aves: Acantisittidae)." Journal of the Royal Society of New Zealand. 21, 2: 179–200.
 Philip R. Millener (1988). "Contributions to New Zealand's late Quaternary avifauna. I: Pachyplichas, a new genus of wren (Aves: Acanthisittidae), with two new species." Journal of the Royal Society of New Zealand. 18:383–406
 Wilson, K-J, (2004) Flight of the Huia, Canterbury University Press, Christchurch. 
 World Conservation Monitoring Centre 1996. Karocolens tuberculatus. In: IUCN 2004. 2004 IUCN Red List of Threatened Species. <www.iucnredlist.org>. Downloaded on 2 March 2006.
 World Conservation Monitoring Centre 1996. Mecodema punctellum''. In: IUCN 2004. 2004 IUCN Red List of Threatened Species. <www.iucnredlist.org>. Downloaded on 2 March 2006.
 Worthy, T.H. 1998. The Quaternary fossil avifauna of Southland, South Island, New Zealand. Journal of The Royal Society of New Zealand. Volume 28, Number 4, pp 537–589.
 Worthy, T.H., Holdaway R.N., 2002, The lost world of the Moa: Prehistoric Life of New Zealand, Indiana University Press, Bloomington. .

External links
 IUCN Red List of Threatened Species
 New Zealand extinct birds at TerraNature
 Rediscovered New Zealand birds previously thought extinct at TerraNature

 
Extinct animals
New Zealand
Lists of extinct animals by region

Holocene Oceania
Extinctions since 1500